Burmagomphus chaukulensis is a species of dragonfly in the family Gomphidae. The species name chaukulensis is coined from the type locality, Chaukul, Sindhudurg, Maharashtra.

See also
 List of odonates of India
 List of odonata of Kerala

References

Gomphidae
Insects described in 2022